Computer fraud is a cybercrime and the act of using a computer to take or alter electronic data, or to gain unlawful use of a computer or system.  In the United States, computer fraud is specifically proscribed by the Computer Fraud and Abuse Act, which criminalizes computer-related acts under federal jurisdiction. 

Types of computer fraud include:

Distributing hoax emails
Accessing unauthorized computers
Engaging in data mining via spyware and malware
Hacking into computer systems to illegally access personal information, such as credit cards or Social Security numbers
Sending computer viruses or worms with the intent to destroy or ruin another party's computer or system.

Phishing, social engineering, viruses, and DDoS attacks are fairly well-known tactics used to disrupt service or gain access to another's network, but this list is not inclusive.

Notable incidents

The Melissa Virus/Worm
The Melissa Virus appeared on thousands of email systems on 26 March 1999. It was disguised in each instance as an important message from a colleague or friend. The virus was designed to send an infected email to the first 50 email addresses on the users’ Microsoft Outlook address book. Each infected computer would infect 50 additional computers, which in turn would infect another 50 computers. The virus proliferated rapidly and exponentially, resulting in substantial interruption and impairment of public communications and services. Over 300 corporations's email servers were affected by the virus, resulting to an estimated cleanup fee of $80 million. Companies such as Microsoft, Intel, Lockheed Martin and Lucent Technologies were forced to shut down their email gateways due to the vast number of emails the virus was generating.

After an investigation conducted by multiple branches of government and law enforcement, the Melissa Virus/Worm was attributed to David L. Smith, a 32-year-old New Jersey programmer, who was eventually charged with computer fraud. Smith was one of the first people ever to be prosecuted for the act of writing a virus. He was sentenced to 20 months in federal prison and was fined $5,000. In addition, he was also ordered to serve three years of supervised release after completion of his prison sentence. The investigation involved members of New Jersey State Police High Technology Crime Unit, the Federal Bureau of Investigation (FBI), the Justice Department’s Computer Crime and Intellectual Property Section, and the Defense Criminal Investigative Service.

See also
Information security
Information technology audit
Cybercrime

References

External links
Information Security & Computer Fraud Cases & Investigations
Cornell Law: Computer and Internet Fraud

Internet fraud
Information technology audit